Bill Ballenger (born 28 March 1941) was the editor of Inside Michigan Politics a newsletter of Michigan Politics until January 2016.  He previously served as a Republican member of both the Michigan House of Representatives and the Michigan State Senate. In March 2016, he founded The Ballenger Report political blog, followed by a weekly podcast.

Ballenger was born in Flint, Michigan.  He has a bachelor's degree from Princeton University and an MPA from the John F. Kennedy School of Government at Harvard University.  He was the Robert P. & Marjorie Griffin Professor in American Government at Central Michigan University from 2003 until 2007.  He also served for a time as Michigan racing commissioner and director of the Michigan Department of Licensing and Regulation.  Ballenger has for many years been a panelist on the Michigan state politics public affairs television program Off the Record with Tim Skubick on WKAR-TV.

Ballenger was Deputy Assistant Secretary of the U.S. Department of Health, Education & Welfare under Gerald R. Ford.

Sources
Macomb Daily, Jan. 21, 2013.
Michigan Liberal article on Ballenger
Inside Michigan Politics bio of Ballenger

1941 births
Republican Party members of the Michigan House of Representatives
Republican Party Michigan state senators
Princeton University alumni
Harvard Kennedy School alumni
Central Michigan University faculty
20th-century American politicians
Living people